Dry roasting is a process by which heat is applied to dry foodstuffs without the use of oil or water as a carrier. Unlike other dry heat methods, dry roasting is used with foods such as nuts and seeds, in addition to some eaten insects such as house crickets. Dry-roasted foods are stirred as they are roasted to ensure even heating.

Dry roasting can be done in a frying pan or wok (a common way to prepare spices in some cuisines), or in a specialized roaster (as is used for coffee beans or peanuts). Dry roasting changes the chemistry of proteins in the food, changing their flavor, and enhances the scent and taste of some spices. Roasted spices are commonly prepared by adding various herbs, spices and sugars in the frying pan and roasting until brown.

Common dry-roasted foods include peanut butter, which is made from peanuts that have been dry roasted; tea, which is made from tea leaves that have been dry-roasted (either immediately after picking or after fermentation),; and coffee and chocolate, which are made from roasted coffee beans and roasted cocoa beans, respectively.

See also

Coffee roasting

References

Cooking techniques